Nordharz (literally "North Harz") is a municipality in the district of Harz, in Saxony-Anhalt, Germany.

The municipal area consists of eight Ortschaften or municipal divisions:

Abbenrode
Danstedt
Heudeber
Langeln
Schmatzfeld
Stapelburg
Veckenstedt
Wasserleben

The administrative seat is located in Veckenstedt. The municipality was formed in the course of an administrative reform on 1 January 2010 by merging seven municipalities of the former Verwaltungsgemeinschaft ("collective municipality") Nordharz with the municipality of Danstedt, formerly part of the Verwaltungsgemeinschaft Harzvorland-Huy.

References

External links
 Nordharz municipality website

 
Harz (district)